Sparganium glomeratum, the clustered bur-reed, is a species of bur-reed. It is a water plant native to high elevation lakes and marshes of Europe, Asia, and North America. North American populations were doubted as introduced due to its scarce and scattered populations, but a recent herbarium survey found more localities of the species in the central of Canada, concluding the species as circumpolar species.

References

External links

glomeratum
Aquatic plants